George Ballard (c. 1706 – June 1755) was an English antiquary and biographer, the author of Memoirs of Several Ladies of Great Britain (1752).

Life
Ballard was born at Chipping Campden, Gloucestershire. Self-educated, Ballard taught himself Saxon while working in a habit-maker's shop, and attracted the attention of the Saxon scholar Elizabeth Elstob. Lord Chedworth and other local gentlemen provided him with an annuity of £60 a year, enabling Ballard to move to Oxford to use the Bodleian Library. Dr. Jenner appointed him a clerk of Magdalen College, Oxford, and he subsequently became a university beadle.

Ballard died young, and his only printed publication was Memoirs of several ladies of Great Britain, who have been celebrated for their writings, or skill in the learned languages, arts and sciences (Oxford: W. Jackson, 1752). This quarto volume was published by subscription, and dedicated to Sarah Talbot of Kineton, the wife of the clergyman William Talbot of Kineton who had helped him receive patronage as a young man, and Mary Delany. The first woman treated by Ballard's Memoirs is Julian of Norwich; the last is Constantia Grierson (1704/5–1732).

Ballard left a large manuscript collection, and his substantial correspondence, to the Bodleian.

Subjects of Memoirs of Several Ladies of Great Britain 
In the Memoirs, Ballard arranged his sixty-five essays chronologically. This list is alphabetical, and names have been modernized to reflect current practices.

Catherine of Aragon (1485–1536), queen consort
Margaret Ascham (née Harleston; then Howe; c. 1528 – c. 1592), writer and editor
Anne Askew (later Kyme; 1521–1546), poet and preacher
Mary Astell (1666–1731), writer and philosopher
Ann Bacon (née Cooke; 1528–1610), writer and scholar
Mary Basset (née Roper; also Clarke; c. 1523 – 1572), translator and classicist
Ann Baynard (1672–1697), natural philosopher
Margaret Beaufort (1443–1509), politician and patron
Juliana Berners (b. 1388), writer and nun
Elizabeth Bland (fl. 1681 – 1712), Hebraist
Catherina Boevey (née Riches; 1669–1726), philanthropist
Elizabeth Burnet (née Blake; 1661–1709), philanthropist and religious writer
Elizabeth Bury (née Lawrence; 1644–1720), diarist
Elizabeth Cavendish (1626–1663), writer
Margaret Cavendish (née Lucas; c. 1624-1674), writer and philosopher
Katherine Chidley (fl. 1616–1653), Puritan activist and Leveller
Mary Chudleigh (née Lee; 1656–1710), poet and intellectual
Margaret Clement (née Giggs; 1508–1570), scholar
Anne Clifford (1590–1676), autobiographer and patron
Elizabeth Clinton (née Knyvet(t); c. 1570–1638), noblewoman and writer
Mildred Cooke (1526–1689), scholar and translator
Elizabeth Dauncey (née More; 1506–1564), daughter of Thomas More
Eleanor Davies (1590–1652), prophet
Elizabeth Fane (d. 1568), writer and literary patron
Anne Finch (1661–1720), poet
Mary FitzAlan (1540–1557), translator
Grace Gethin (née Norton; 1676–1697), essayist
Jane Grey (1537–1554), scholar
Constantia Grierson (née Crawley; c. 1705-1732), classicist, editor, and poet
Anne Halkett (née Murray; c. 1623 – 1699), religious writer and autobiographer
Cecily Heron (née More; born 1507–?), Latinist and daughter of Thomas More
Susanna Hopton (née Harvey; 1627–1709), religious writer
Jane Howard (1537–1593), noblewoman
Esther Inglis (née Langlois; 1570/71-1624), calligrapher and miniaturist
Margery Kempe (c. 1373 - c. 1440), pilgrim and writer
Anne Killigrew (1660–1685), poet and painter
Catherine Killigrew (c. 1530-1583), gentlewoman and scholar
Elizabeth Legge (1580–1685), linguist & poet
Elizabeth Lucar (née Withypoll; 1510–1537), calligrapher
Jane Lumley (née Fitzalan; 1537–1578), classicist
Damaris Cudworth Masham (1658–1708), philosopher theologian
Mary Monck (née Molesworth; 1677? – 1715), poet
Dudleya North (1675–1712), orientalist, linguist, and classical scholar
Frances Norton (née Freke; 1640–1731), writer
Julian of Norwich (1343–1443), anchorite and writer
Dorothy Pakington (née Coventry; 1623–1679), religious writer
Catherine Parr (1512–1548), queen consort
Blanche Parry (1508-1589), antiquary
Katherine Philips (née Fowler; (1631/2 – 1664), poet
Margaret Roper (née More; 1505–1544), scholar, translator, and daughter of Thomas More
Margaret Rowlett (née Cooke; d. 1558), sister of Ann Bacon, Mildred Cooke, Elizabeth Russell
Elizabeth Russell (née Cooke; 1528–1609), gentlewoman and poet
Anne Seymour (later Dudley; 1538–1588), poet
Jane Seymour (1541–1561), poet
Margaret Seymour (b. 1540), poet
Mary Sidney (later Herbert; 1561–1621), poet
Arbella Stuart (later Seymour; 1575–1615), noblewoman
Mary Stuart (1542–1587), Queen of Scotland 
Catherine Tishem (died 1595), classical scholar
Elizabeth Tudor (1533–1603), Queen of England and Ireland
Mary Tudor (1516–1558), Queen of England and Ireland
Elizabeth Walker (née Sadler; 1623–1690), diarist and pharmacist
Elizabeth Jane Weston (bap. 1581?, d. 1612), scholar & linguist
Anne Wharton (née Lee; 1659–1685), poet and dramatist

Notes

References
 Allibone, S. A. A critical dictionary of English literature. 1859-71.
 Ballard, George. ''Memoirs of several ladies of Great Britain. Edited with an introduction by Ruth Perry. Detroit: Wayne State University Press, 1985.
 Chalmers, A. The general biographical dictionary. 1812-1817.

External links
Full digitized text available at HathiTrust: Memoirs of several ladies of Great Britain, who have been celebrated for their writings, or skill in the learned languages, arts and sciences (Oxford: W. Jackson, 1752).
Full digitized text available at the Internet Archive: Memoirs of several ladies of Great Britain, who have been celebrated for their writings, or skill in the learned languages, arts and sciences (Oxford: W. Jackson, 1752).

1706 births
1755 deaths
People from Chipping Campden
English biographers
18th-century English writers
18th-century English male writers
18th-century English people
Prosopography
Historiography
Biographical dictionaries of women